Louis Kunkel may refer to:

Louis M. Kunkel (born 1949), American geneticist
Louis Otto Kunkel (1884–1960), American plant pathologist